Orrell Urban District was, from 1894 to 1974, a local government district in the administrative county of Lancashire, England. Its boundaries were centred on Orrell, but also included parts of Upholland.

The district covered a significant area to the west of the County Borough of Wigan.

The Urban District was created by the Local Government Act 1894. In 1974 Orrell Urban District was abolished by the Local Government Act 1972 and most its former territories transferred to Greater Manchester to form part of the Metropolitan Borough of Wigan (the rest being transferred to West Lancashire).

References
A vision of Orrell UD, visionofbritain.org.uk. URL accessed February 20, 2007.

Local government in the Metropolitan Borough of Wigan
Districts of England created by the Local Government Act 1894
Districts of England abolished by the Local Government Act 1972
History of Lancashire
History of the Metropolitan Borough of Wigan
Urban districts of England